Brian Gallagher (born 18 December 1945) was a Scottish footballer who played for Partick Thistle, Morton and Dumbarton.

References

1945 births
Scottish footballers
Dumbarton F.C. players
Partick Thistle F.C. players
Greenock Morton F.C. players
Scottish Football League players
Living people
Place of birth missing (living people)
Association football forwards